Ishai Golan is an Israeli film and television actor.

Early life
He was born in Ramat Gan, Israel.

Career
Golan attended Telma Yalin Arts High School in Givatayim. In 1990, he got his first cinematic role at the age of 17 in the film '' (The Eagle's Path) that was directed by Uri Barbash and starring Gidi Gov, Eli Danker and Nurit Galron. He stated that 'This film has shaped my awareness about being an actor. From the moment that I participated in this movie, I understood that this is me and this is my place'. He also appeared in Amos Guttman's Amazing Grace (1992) and in '' (Overdose).

Golan served in the IDF in the military theater. After his military service, he attended the London Academy of Music and Dramatic Art. Regarding his time in the academy, Golan said that even though he knew English, it took him a couple of months to get used to learning plays by William Shakespeare but after that time period he started to dream in Shakespeare's language. In 1996, Golan starred in the Ken Russell-directed TV film Mindbender, a Uri Geller biopic. Later on he appeared in the films Operation YY (2000), Six Million Fragments (2000), Rashevsky's Tango (2003) and Love Life (2007). Golan also appeared in minor roles in a number of American films shot in Israel. In 2011, in the film '' (By Summer's End), he played a father who returns to his family for a visit after abandoning them. A year later he co-starred in the provocative film '' (The Slut). His first appearance in a television series was in Fool's gold (1994), later he appeared on Siton (1995), and in 1999's '' (Recruit Training), he portrayed Tomer, a new Israeli soldier who falls in love with Officer Jenia. The role on that show is what convinced Golan to return to Israel after Uri Barbash called to Golan which was still in London during that time and offered him to come back to Israel to play on the show. Golan stated that he remembers that after the phone call ended, he was so happy and full of joy that Barbash was saving him from the desperation that he was experiencing during that time as an actor in his first phases on his career in the acting industry of London.

During the 2000s, Golan appeared on television series Love Around The Corner (2003), The Island (2007) and I didn't promise (2007). In 2010, he co-starred in the critically acclaimed series Prisoners of War and portrayed Uri, a prisoner of war who returns home 17 years after he was captured by enemy. For this performance, he won the Israeli Academy of Film and Television award for best actor in a drama series. In 2012, he appeared on the comedy series '' (Get Some Rest) alongside Yael Grobglas who worked with him on The Island.

Golan also appeared in many theatre plays such as "Lovers and Pleasant", "The Withdrawal From Moscow", "Railway to Damascus" and "One Flew Over the Cuckoo's Nest" in Habima Theatre, "Children of a Lesser God" in Beersheba Theater, as well as "Transparent Roof", "Bianka" and "Then in Prague" at the Beit Lessin Theater, and "All My Sons" in Haifa Theatre.

In 2012 he starting hosting the Fox Life show Street Food Around The World. In each show Golan is showing the street food of a specific city as he visits food stands, restaurants and local chefs. In 2014, he co-starred in False Flag and portrayed Ben Rephael, an Israeli chemist and a family man who is implicated together with 4 other Israeli citizens in a high-profile kidnapping that is covered by the media all over the world. In 2017, Golan portrayed Carter Woods in the teen drama series "Greenhouse Academy."

Filmography

Personal life
Golan resides in Tel Aviv with his wife Ruti, a child psychologist, and three children. In the 2013 elections he strongly supported Da'am Workers Party.

References

External links

 

1973 births
Living people
Israeli Jews
Israeli male film actors
Israeli male television actors
20th-century Israeli male actors
21st-century Israeli male actors
Israeli people of Russian-Jewish descent
Jewish Israeli male actors
Thelma Yellin High School of Arts alumni
 Israeli expatriates in Canada